Statistics of the 1989–90 Saudi First Division.

External links 
 Saudi Arabia Football Federation
 Saudi League Statistics
 Al Jazirah 1 Feb 1987 issue 5239 

Saudi First Division League seasons
Saudi Professional League
2